Portugal participated in the Eurovision Song Contest 2014 with the song "Quero ser tua" written by Emanuel. The song was performed by Suzy. In November 2013, the Portuguese broadcaster Rádio e Televisão de Portugal (RTP) announced that they would be returning to the Eurovision Song Contest after a one-year absence following their withdrawal in 2013 due to financial reasons. RTP organised the national final Festival da Canção 2014 in order to select the Portuguese entry for the 2014 contest in Copenhagen, Denmark. After a semi-final and a final which took place in March 2014, "Quero ser tua" performed by Suzy emerged as the winner after gaining 41.56% of the public televote.

Portugal was drawn to compete in the second semi-final of the Eurovision Song Contest which took place on 6 May 2014. Performing during the show in position 13, "Quero ser tua" was not announced among the top 10 entries of the first semi-final and therefore did not qualify to compete in the final. It was later revealed that Portugal placed eleventh out of the 16 participating countries in the semi-final with 39 points.

Background 

Prior to the 2014 contest, Portugal had participated in the Eurovision Song Contest forty-six times since its first entry in 1964. The nation's highest placing in the contest was sixth, which they achieved in 1996 with the song "O meu coração não tem cor" performed by Lúcia Moniz. Following the introduction of semi-finals for the 2004, Portugal had featured in only three finals. Portugal's least successful result has been last place, which they have achieved on three occasions, most recently in 1997 with the song "Antes do adeus" performed by Célia Lawson. Portugal has also received nul points on two occasions; in 1964 and 1997. The nation failed to qualify to the final in 2012 with the song "Vida minha" performed by Filipa Sousa.

The Portuguese national broadcaster, Rádio e Televisão de Portugal (RTP), broadcasts the event within Portugal and organises the selection process for the nation's entry. The broadcaster has traditionally selected the Portuguese entry for the Eurovision Song Contest via the music competition Festival da Canção, with exceptions in 1988 and 2005 when the Portuguese entries were internally selected. The Portuguese broadcaster announced in November 2012 that the country would not participate in 2013 for financial reasons. Following their one-year absence, RTP confirmed Portugal's participation in the 2014 Eurovision Song Contest on 7 November 2013. On 14 January 2014, the broadcaster revealed details regarding their selection procedure and announced the organization of Festival da Canção 2014 in order to select the 2014 Portuguese entry.

Before Eurovision

Festival da Canção 2014 
Festival da Canção 2014 was the 49th edition of Festival da Canção that selected Portugal's entry for the Eurovision Song Contest 2014. Ten entries competed in the competition that consisted of a semi-final held on 8 March 2014 leading to a five-song final on 15 March 2014. Both shows of the competition took place at the Convento do Beato in Lisbon, hosted by Sílvia Alberto and José Carlos Malato with Joana Teles hosting from the green room, and were broadcast on RTP1, RTP África, RTP Internacional and RTP HD as well as online via the broadcaster's official website rtp.pt.

Format
The format of the competition consisted of two shows: a semi-final on 8 March 2014 and the final on 15 March 2014. The semi-final featured ten competing entries from which five advanced from the show to complete the five song lineup in the final. Results during the semi-final and the final were determined exclusively by public televoting. The public televote for the final was opened following the semi-final and closed during the show.

Competing entries 
Ten Portuguese and foreign composers were invited by RTP for the competition. The composers both created the songs, which were required to be in Portuguese, and selected its performers with the approval of RTP. The selected composers were revealed on 28 January 2014, while the competing artists were revealed on 11 February 2014. The composers were:

Andrej Babić
Emanuel
Hélder Godinho
Jan Van Dijck
João Matos
João Só
Luís Fernando, Rui Fingers and Ricardo Afonso
Marc Paelinck
Nuno Feist
Tozé Santos

Shows

Semi-final
The semi-final took place on 8 March 2014. Ten entries competed and five advanced to the final based on the results of a public televote. In addition to the performances of the competing entries, Portuguese Eurovision 1985 entrant Adelaide Ferreira, Portuguese Eurovision 1986 and 1988 entrants Dora, Portuguese Eurovision 1995 entrant Tó Cruz and Portuguese Eurovision 2008 entrant Vânia Fernandes performed as the interval acts.

Final
The final took place on 15 March 2014. The five entries that qualified from the preceding semi-final competed and the winner, "Quero ser tua" performed by Suzy, was selected solely by a public televote. In addition to the performances of the competing entries, Henrique Feist and Portuguese Eurovision 1996 entrant Lucia Móniz performed as the interval acts.

Controversy
Following Suzy's victory at Festival da Canção 2014, second and third-placed acts Catarina Pereira and Rui Andrade raised concerns about the outcome of the competition, which involved suspicions that the composer of "Quero ser tua", Emanuel, had influenced the televote in favour of the victory of his entry. The composer of Pereira's song, Carlos Coelho, stated that he would request an audit due to the discrepancy of the results and violation of rules, involving the difference of the number of votes allowed per telephone in both shows, the use of stage props, and the editing and reproduction rights of the competing songs.

Promotion 
Suzy made several appearances across Europe to specifically promote "Quero ser tua" as the Portuguese Eurovision entry. On 5 April, Suzy performed during the Eurovision in Concert event which was held at the Melkweg venue in Amsterdam, Netherlands and hosted by Cornald Maas and Sandra Reemer. She also performed during the London Eurovision Party on 13 April, which was held at the Café de Paris venue in London, United Kingdom and hosted by Nicki French and Paddy O'Connell.

At Eurovision

According to Eurovision rules, all nations with the exceptions of the host country and the "Big Five" (France, Germany, Italy, Spain and the United Kingdom) are required to qualify from one of two semi-finals in order to compete for the final; the top ten countries from each semi-final progress to the final. The European Broadcasting Union (EBU) split up the competing countries into six different pots based on voting patterns from previous contests, with countries with favourable voting histories put into the same pot. On 20 January 2014, a special allocation draw was held which placed each country into one of the two semi-finals, as well as which half of the show they would perform in. Portugal was placed into the first semi-final, to be held on 6 May 2014, and was scheduled to perform in the second half of the show.

Once all the competing songs for the 2014 contest had been released, the running order for the semi-finals was decided by the shows' producers rather than through another draw, so that similar songs were not placed next to each other. Portugal was set to perform in position 13, following the entry from San Marino and before the entry from Netherlands.

In Portugal, the three shows were broadcast on RTP1, RTP1 HD and RTP Internacional with commentary by Sílvia Alberto. The first semi-final and the final were broadcast live, while the second semi-final was broadcast on delay. The Portuguese spokesperson, who announced the Portuguese votes during the final, was Joana Teles.

Semi-final 
Suzy took part in technical rehearsals on 29 April and 2 May, followed by dress rehearsals on 5 and 6 May. This included the jury final where professional juries of each country watched and voted on the competing entries.

The Portuguese performance featured Suzy dressed in a red short outfit, designed by designer João Rolo, performing choreography with two backing vocalists, two dancers playing two large drums that light as they were beat and waving red flags, and a percussionist performing on a hand drum. The LED screens displayed red, green and yellow colours with a wind machine special effect being used. The performance was choreographed by Paulo Magalhães. The backing vocalists were Marta Mota and Sara Campina, the dancers were Luís Filipe Pimenta and Renato Nobre, while the percussionist was Jefferson Negreiros.

At the end of the show, Portugal was not announced among the top 10 entries in the first semi-final and therefore failed to qualify to compete in the final. It was later revealed that Portugal placed eleventh in the semi-final, receiving a total of 39 points.

Voting 
Voting during the three shows involved each country awarding points from 1–8, 10 and 12 as determined by a combination of 50% national jury and 50% televoting. Each nation's jury consisted of five music industry professionals who were citizens of the country they represent, with their names published before the contest to ensure transparency. This jury was asked to judge each contestant based on: vocal capacity; the stage performance; the song's composition and originality; and the overall impression by the act. In addition, no member of a national jury could be related in any way to any of the competing acts in such a way that they cannot vote impartially and independently. The individual rankings of each jury member were released shortly after the grand final.

Following the release of the full split voting by the EBU after the conclusion of the competition, it was revealed that Portugal had placed seventh with the public televote and sixteenth (last) with the jury vote in the first semi-final. In the public vote, Portugal scored 72 points, while with the jury vote, Portugal scored 17 points.

Below is a breakdown of points awarded to Portugal and awarded by Portugal in the first semi-final and grand final of the contest, and the breakdown of the jury voting and televoting conducted during the two shows:

Points awarded to Portugal

Points awarded by Portugal

Detailed voting results
The following members comprised the Portuguese jury:
 Paula Ferreira (jury chairperson)event promoter
 José Cabritaevent promoter
 Jan Van Dijckcomposer
 Ana Augustosinger
 Marina Ferrazlyricist

Notes

References

2014
Countries in the Eurovision Song Contest 2014
Eurovision
Articles containing video clips